Sammy Cowell (born October 8, 1991) is a Thai actress and model. She entered the entertainment industry by winning Thai Supermodel Contest 2007 and has worked in various TV dramas, movies and modeling works (commercials, photo shoots, runway walks) ever since. Her notable works are Nang Baeb Koke Gradone, Pleng Ruk Pha Puen Taek, Lueam Salab Lai, Fai Ruk Game Rohn, Ratchawanee Tee Ruk and Lhong Ngao Jun.

Early life and education
Sammy Cowell was born to a British father, Samuel Derek Cowell, and a Thai mother, Pityanit. She has a half sister. She graduated with a Bachelor of Business Administration majoring in Human Resource Management from Ramkhamhaeng University.

The origin of the nickname Sammy comes from the word Sam, her father's name. Her older sister then added the word Mi to the end of the name until it became Sammy and has used this name in the entertainment industry.

Career
Sammy began her career as a model in an ice-cream commercial and later participated in a 2007 Thailand Supermodel Contest which she won. Sammy was subsequently signed with Channel 7 Thailand. She started with a supporting role for a prime time drama and some lead roles for evening drama. She was one of the main actresses for Channel 7 Thailand. Currently, she is an independent actress and not affiliated to any channel.

Filmography

Drama

Online drama

Film

OST

Awards

References
 Sammy Cowell on Instagram
 Sammy Cowell on TikTok

Sammy Cowell
1991 births
Living people
Sammy Cowell
Sammy Cowell
Sammy Cowell
Sammy Cowell
Sammy Cowell